The Big Hurt may refer to:

In music:
The Big Hurt (song), a popular 1959 song written by Wayne Shanklin and sung by Miss Toni Fisher.

In sports (is a nickname for):
 Frank Thomas (designated hitter), American League MLB player from 1990 to 2008
 Stan Williams (baseball), MLB pitcher from 1958 to 1972
 Jack Swagger, AEW Sports-Entertainer from 2019 - now
In film
The Big Hurt (film) Australian 1986 low-budget thriller